Breckenridge Hills is a city in St. Louis County, Missouri, United States. As of the 2010 census, the city population was 4,746.

Geography
Breckenridge Hills is located at  (38.715687, -90.369078).

Demographics

2020 census
As of the 2020 census, there were 4,458 people living in the city. The racial makeup of the city was 37.2% White, 33.3% African American, 1.7% Native American, 1.3% Asian, 17.2% from other races, and 9.3% from two or more races. Hispanic or Latino of any race were 25.0% of the population.

2010 census
As of the census of 2010, there were 4,746 people, 1,911 households, and 1,138 families living in the city. The racial makeup of the city was 53.5% White, 32.7% African American, 0.4% Native American, 0.6% Asian, 0.1% Pacific Islander, 8.9% from other races, and 3.8% from two or more races. Hispanic or Latino of any race were 15.6% of the population.

There were 1,911 households, of which 35.4% had children under the age of 18 living with them, 27.2% were married couples living together, 24.3% had a female householder with no husband present, 8.1% had a male householder with no wife present, and 40.5% were non-families. 32.5% of all households were made up of individuals, and 8.9% had someone living alone who was 65 years of age or older. The average household size was 2.48 and the average family size was 3.12.

The median age in the city was 32.7 years. 26.9% of residents were under the age of 18; 10.7% were between the ages of 18 and 24; 28.7% were from 25 to 44; 24.6% were from 45 to 64; and 9.1% were 65 years of age or older. The gender makeup of the city was 48.5% male and 51.5% female.

2000 census
As of the census of 2000, there were 4,817 people, 1,999 households, and 1,211 families living in the city. The racial makeup of the city was 65.89% White, 28.81% African American, 0.21% Native American, 0.46% Asian, 0.06% Pacific Islander, 2.12% from other races, and 2.45% from two or more races. Hispanic or Latino of any race were 3.92% of the population.

There were 1,999 households, out of which 31.8% had children under the age of 18 living with them, 33.4% were married couples living together, 22.3% had a female householder with no husband present, and 39.4% were non-families. 31.4% of all households were made up of individuals, and 8.2% had someone living alone who was 65 years of age or older. The average household size was 2.41 and the average family size was 3.04.

In the city, the population was spread out, with 27.6% under the age of 18, 10.0% from 18 to 24, 32.8% from 25 to 44, 19.1% from 45 to 64, and 10.6% who were 65 years of age or older. The median age was 33 years. For every 100 females, there were 89.6 males. For every 100 females age 18 and over, there were 85.3 males.

The median income for a household in the city was $34,671, and the median income for a family was $41,515. Males had a median income of $27,487 versus $22,743 for females. The per capita income for the city was $16,847. About 15.2% of families and 17.3% of the population were below the poverty line, including 22.8% of those under age 18 and 10.5% of those age 65 or over.

References

Cities in St. Louis County, Missouri
Cities in Missouri